Clinton Smith III (born August 25, 1988) is an American writer, poet and scholar. He is the author of #1 New York Times Best Seller, How the Word Is Passed, which won the 2021 National Book Critics Circle Award for Nonfiction and was named one of the top ten books of 2021 by the New York Times. He is also the author of two poetry collections, Counting Descent, which was published in 2016 and Above Ground, set to be published in March 2023. Smith received a doctorate from Harvard University.

Early life 
Smith grew up in New Orleans, where he went to Benjamin Franklin High School for his first three years of high school and later attended the Awty International School in Houston, Texas for his senior year because he and his family fled New Orleans due to Hurricane Katrina. He attended Davidson College, graduating in 2010 with a B.A. in English.

Career 

Smith taught high school English in Prince George's County, Maryland where he was named the Christine D. Sarbanes Teacher of the Year by the Maryland Humanities Council. He then pursued doctoral work at the Harvard Graduate School of Education with a concentration in Culture, Institutions, and Society, earning his PhD in 2020 with his dissertation focusing how children sentenced to life without parole experience educational programming while they are incarcerated.

He was part of the winning team at the 2014 National Poetry Slam and was a 2017 recipient of the Jerome J. Shestack Prize from The American Poetry Review. Smith published his first book of poetry, Counting Descent, in 2016. It won the 2017 Literary Award for Best Poetry Book from the Black Caucus of the American Library Association and was a finalist for the NAACP Image Awards. He was on the 2018 Forbes 30 Under 30 list and Ebony's 2017 Power 100 list.

Smith has also been a contributor to The New Yorker magazine. His work is included in the anthology The Fire This Time: A New Generation Speaks about Race (2016), edited by Jesmyn Ward. Smith's second book, How the Word Is Passed, was published by Little, Brown on June 1, 2021. It was selected for the New York Times Book Reviews "10 Best Books of 2021" list, and he won the Dayton Literary Peace Prize for nonfiction for it.

He currently serves as a staff writer at The Atlantic, where his piece, "Monuments to the Unthinkable" was featured as the cover story in December 2022. He hosted Crash Course's Black American History series, which ran from 2021 until late in 2022.

A fan of the Arsenal F.C. football (soccer) club and a former college soccer player, Smith has written several essays on the sport.

Awards and honors 

 2022 Dayton Literary Peace Prize Nonfiction Winner
 2022 Stowe Prize
 2022 Hillman Prize for Book Journalism
 2021 National Book Critics Circle Award for Nonfiction
 2021 New York Times "Best Books of 2021 List"
 2021 Time Magazine "10 Best Nonfiction Books of 2021"
 2021 The Root 100
 2021 GQ "50 Best Books of Literary Journalism of the 21st Century"
 2021 Andrew W Mellon Foundation Fellow-in-Residence
 2020 Emerson Fellow at New America
 2018 Forbes' "30 Under 30"
 2018 Art for Justice Grantee
 2017 NAACP Image Award Finalist
 2017 Literary Award for Best Poetry Book
 2017 Ebony's Power 100 List
 2014 National Poetry Slam Winner
 2013 Christine D. Sarabanes Teacher of the Year

Personal life 
Smith resides in Maryland with his wife and two children.

References

External links 

 

1988 births
Living people
21st-century American poets
African-American poets
Davidson College alumni
Harvard Graduate School of Education alumni
Writers from New Orleans
African-American Catholics
21st-century African-American writers
20th-century African-American people